Richard Eastell MD, FRCP (London, Edinburgh, Ireland), FRCPath, FMedSci is a British medical doctor and Professor of Bone Metabolism at the University of Sheffield. He was born in Shipley (West Yorkshire) and attended the Salt Grammar School, later graduating from the University of Edinburgh in 1977 with an MB ChB and in 1984 with an MD and achieved prominence as an expert in osteoporosis.

Bone metabolism 
Eastell has pioneered new techniques for measuring calcium uptake and vitamin D conversion and is a leading expert in osteoporosis diagnosis, implementation of bone turnover markers and new osteoporosis treatments. 

While at the Mayo Clinic, Eastell developed new non-radioactive methods for measuring how calcium was absorbed from the diet and a new technique for measuring 1,25-OH2D3 production as well as refining the use of bone densitometry and a new approach for identifying vertebral fractures on radiographs of the spine. After returning to the UK, Eastell set up a metabolic bone service at the Northern General Hospital. More recent contributions have been within the area of bioclinical bone turnover markers and leadership of clinical trials in the osteoporosis area for new osteoporosis treatments.

Eastell has supervised the study for 37 doctoral degrees over the past 30 years and published over 550 research papers.

Controversies

Eastell was the subject of a 2005 report in the Times Higher Education Supplement concerning allegations that he had incorrectly claimed to have had full access to data for a trial of the Procter & Gamble drug Actonel.  The report claimed that the analysis for the trial had been carried out by Procter & Gamble and that Eastell did not in fact have complete access to the data.  Eastell wrote a letter in 2007 to the editors of the Journal of Bone and Mineral Research, where the paper in question was published in 2003, accepting that he had not disclosed limitations on data access as required by the journal and acknowledging certain errors in the paper.  At a General Medical Council "fitness to practice" hearing in November 2009, it was determined that Eastell's actions had not been "deliberately misleading or dishonest", although he may have been negligent in making "untrue" and "misleading" declarations; the council did not make a finding of misconduct.

The THE's report on Eastell was in part the result of whistleblowing by another Sheffield academic, Aubrey Blumsohn, who was initially suspended by the university and subsequently left the university with a "six-figure" payout.  Other bone medicine academics, speaking on BBC Radio 4's programme "You and Yours", took the view that the paper in question had overstated the effectiveness of the drug.

Eastell resigned as director of research at Sheffield National Health Service Trust in 2006 after allegations of "financial irregularities" related to charging the NHS for laboratory tests in connection with his university research.  His resignation followed suspension by the NHS when the allegations were made in May 2005. The NHS trust did not produce an investigation report, stating that this was pre-empted by Eastell's resignation.

In 2010 Eastell was involved in a further dispute with a colleague over a clinical trial and the right of that colleague to present commercially sensitive data.

Eastell is Professor of Bone Metabolism at the University of Sheffield and Director of the Mellanby Centre for Musculoskeletal Research.

Awards and honours 
 Corrigan Lecturer, Royal College of Physicians of Ireland, 1998
 Kohn Award, National Osteoporosis Society, 2004
 Society for Endocrinology Medal, 2004
 Senior Investigator, National Institute for Health and Care Research (NIHR), 2009.
Winner of the ECTS/ASBMR Golden Femur Award 2010 and 2012.
Frederick C Bartter Award from the American Society for Bone and Mineral Research, 2014.

See also 
 List of scientific misconduct incidents
Sophie Jamal, a collaborator of Eastell's who was also involved in osteoporosis research fraud

References

External links
 Academic Unit of Bone Metabolism
 Metabolic Bone Centre
 The Mellanby  Centre at the University of Sheffield

British medical researchers
Living people
Alumni of the University of Edinburgh
20th-century English medical doctors
21st-century English medical doctors
Fellows of the Royal College of Physicians
Fellows of the Royal College of Physicians of Edinburgh
Fellows of the Royal College of Pathologists
Fellows of the Academy of Medical Sciences (United Kingdom)
NIHR Senior Investigators
Academics of the University of Sheffield
Year of birth missing (living people)